The 2013–14 La Salle Explorers basketball team represented La Salle University during the 2013–14 NCAA Division I men's basketball season. The Explorers, led by tenth year head coach John Giannini, played their home games at Tom Gola Arena and were members of the Atlantic 10 Conference. They finished the season 15–16, 7–9 in A-10 play to finish in eighth place. They lost in the second round of the A-10 tournament to St. Bonaventure.

Roster

Schedule

|-
!colspan=9 style="background:#00386B; color:#FFC700;"| Exhibition

|-
!colspan=9 style="background:#00386B; color:#FFC700;"| Regular season

|-
!colspan=9 style="background:#00386B; color:#FFC700;"| Atlantic 10 tournament

References

La Salle Explorers men's basketball seasons
La Salle
La Salle
La Salle